Micromyrtus rogeri is a plant species of the family Myrtaceae endemic to Western Australia.

It blooms between July and October producing white flowers.

It is found on breakaways in the Mid West and Wheatbelt regions of Western Australia between Moora and Three Springs where it grows in sandy soils over gravel and laterite.

References

rogeri
Flora of Western Australia
Plants described in 2002
Taxa named by Barbara Lynette Rye